Novus homo or homo novus (Latin for 'new man';  novi homines or homines novi) was the term in ancient Rome for a man who was the first in his family to serve in the Roman Senate or, more specifically, to be elected as consul. When a man entered public life on an unprecedented scale for a high communal office, then the term used was novus civis ( novi cives) or "new citizen".

History

In the Early Republic, tradition held that both Senate membership and the consulship were restricted to patricians. When plebeians gained the right to this office during the Conflict of the Orders, all newly elected plebeians were naturally novi homines. With time, novi homines became progressively rarer as some plebeian families became as entrenched in the Senate as their patrician colleagues. By the time of the First Punic War, it was already a sensation that novi homines were elected in two consecutive years (Gaius Fundanius Fundulus in 243 BC and Gaius Lutatius Catulus in 242 BC). In 63 BC, Cicero became the first novus homo in more than thirty years.

By the Late Republic, the distinction between the orders became less important. The consuls came from a new elite, the nobiles (noblemen), an artificial aristocracy of all who could demonstrate direct descent in the male line from a consul.

List of notable novi homines
Lucius Sextius Lateranus (elected 366 BC)
Gaius Licinius Stolo (elected 361 BC)
Marcus Popillius Laenas (elected 359, 356, 350, 348 BC)
Gaius Plautius Proculus (elected 358 BC)
Gaius Marcius Rutilus (elected 357, 352, 344, 342 BC)
Publius Decius Mus (elected 340 BC)
Lucius Volumnius Flamma Violens (elected 307 BC and 296 BC)
Spurius Carvilius Maximus (elected 293, 272 BC)
Manius Otacilius Crassus (elected 263 BC)
 Gaius Duilius (elected 260 BC)
Gaius Aurelius Cotta (elected 252 and 248 BC)
 Gaius Fundanius Fundulus (elected 243 BC)
 Gaius Lutatius Catulus (elected 242 BC)
 Gaius Flaminius (elected 223 BC and 217 BC)
 Marcus Porcius Cato (the Censor/Elder) (elected 195 BC)
Gaius Calpurnius Piso (elected 180 BC)
Gnaeus Octavius (elected 165 BC)
Lucius Mummius Achaicus (elected 146 BC)
Quintus Pompeius (elected 141 BC)
 Gaius Marius (elected 107 BC, 104–100 BC, 86 BC)
 Gnaeus Mallius Maximus (elected 105 BC)
 Titus Didius (elected 98 BC)
Gaius Coelius Caldus (elected 94 BC)
 Gnaeus Pompeius Strabo (elected 89 BC)
 Marcus Tullius Cicero (elected 63 BC)
 Marcus Vinicius (appointed suffect consul 19 BC)
 Gaius Pomponius Graecinus (appointed AD 16)
 Gaius Cornelius Tacitus (appointed AD 97)

Topos of the "new man"
The literary theme of homo novus, or "how the lowly born but inherently worthy man may properly rise to eminence in the world" was the topos of Seneca's influential Epistle XLIV.  At the endpoint of Late Antiquity, it was likewise a subject in Boethius' Consolation of Philosophy (iii, vi). In the Middle Ages Dante's Convivio (book IV) and Petrarch's De remediis utriusque fortunae (I.16; II.5) take up the subject, and Chaucer's Wife of Bath's Tale.

In its Christian renderings, the theme suggested a tension in the scala naturae or great chain of being, one that was produced through the agency of Man's free will.

The theme came naturally to Renaissance humanists who were often homines novi  rising by their own wits in a network of noble courts that depended on the highly literate new men to run increasingly complicated chancelries and create the cultural propaganda that was a contemporary vehicle for noble fame, and that consequently offered a kind of intellectual cursus honorum. In the fifteenth century Buonaccorso da Montemagno's Dialogus de vera nobilitate treated of the "true nobility" inherent in the worthy individual; Poggio Bracciolini also wrote at length De nobilitate, stressing the Renaissance view of human responsibility and effectiveness that are at the heart of Humanism: sicut virtutis ita et nobilitatis sibi quisque existit auctor et opifex.

Briefer summaries of the theme were to be found in Francesco Patrizi,  (VI.1), and in Rodrigo Sánchez de Arévalo's encyclopedic Speculum vitae humanae. In the sixteenth century these and new texts came to be widely printed and distributed. Sánchez de Arévalo's Speculum was first printed at Rome, 1468, and there are more than twenty fifteenth-century printings; German, French and Spanish translations were printed. The characters of Baldassare Castiglione's The Book of the Courtier (1528) discuss the requirement that a cortegiano be noble (I.XIV-XVI). This was translated into French, Spanish, English, Latin and other languages. Jerónimo Osório da Fonseca's De nobilitate (Lisbon 1542, and seven reprintings in the sixteenth century), stressing propria strennuitas ("one's own determined striving") received an English translation in 1576.

The Roman figure most often cited as an exemplum is Gaius Marius, whose speech of self-justification was familiar to readers from the set-piece in Sallust's Bellum Iugurthinum, 85; the most familiar format in the Renaissance treatises is a dialogue that contrasts the two sources of nobility, with the evidence weighted in favor of the "new man".

See also 

 New men
 New Man (utopian concept)
 Homo Ludens
 Homo Sovieticus
 Nouveau riche
 The Iliad, the first example of the common man in literature
 Heroic fantasy, sources Roman and Greek literature for virtus and the common man

Notes

Further reading
 Burckhardt, Leonhardt A. 1990. "The Political Elite of the Roman Republic: Comments on Recent Discussion of the Concepts Nobilitas and Homo Novus." Historia 39:77–99.
 Carney, Thomas F. 1959. "Once Again Marius’ Speech after Election in 108 B.C." Symbolae Osloensis 35.1: 63–70.
 Dugan, John. 2005. Making a New Man: Ciceronian Self-Fashioning in the Rhetorical Works. Oxford: Oxford Univ. Press.
 Feig Vishnia, Rachel. 2012. Roman Elections in the Age of Cicero: Society, Government, and Voting. London: Routledge.
 Hill, Herbert. 1969. "Nobilitas in the Imperial Period." Historia 18.2: 230–250.
 Späth, Thomas. 2010. "Cicero, Tullia, and Marcus: Gender-specific Issues for Family Tradition?" In Children, Memory, and Family Identity in Roman Culture. Edited by Véronique Dasen, 147-172. Oxford; New York: Oxford University Press.
 van der Blom, Henriette. 2010. Cicero’s Role models: The Political Strategy of a Newcomer. Oxford: Oxford Univ. Press.
 Vanderbroeck, Paul J. J. 1986. "Homo Novus Again." Chiron 16:239–242.
 Wiseman, T. Peter. 1971. New Men in the Roman Senate, 139 B.C.—A.D. 14. Oxford: Oxford Univ. Press.
 Wright, Andrew. 2002. "Velleius Paterculus and L. Munatius Plancus." Classical Philology 97.4: 178–184.
 Wylie, Graham J. 1993. "P. Ventidius: From Novus Homo to “Military Hero.”" Acta Classica 36:129–141.

External links

 Dictionary of the History of Ideas: "Renaissance Idea of the Dignity of Man"

Society of ancient Rome
Ancient Roman titles